Pedro Barrantes (1850–1912) was a Spanish writer and journalist.

Works

Lyrical 
Delirium tremens: (poems) Madrid, 1890 (Celestino Apaolaza reprinted, 1910)
Anatemas, (Valencia, 1892).
Con Severiano Nicoláu, Dios: canto Valencia, 1888 (Printing house Casa de Beneficencia) 
El drama del calvario: poema Madrid: Printing establishment P. Nuñez, 1887.
Tierra y cielo, Madrid: El Adalid, 1896.

Other 
Weyler... Madrid, 1899 (Imp. de Antonio Marzo) 
El Padre Sanz Madrid, 1899 (Antonio Marzo) 
Polavieja Madrid, 1899 (Imp. de A. Marzo)

External links
 

Writers from the Valencian Community
People from Valencia
1850 births
1912 deaths